That Face is a two-act play written by Polly Stenham.  It premiered at the Royal Court Theatre in London on 26 April 2007, directed by Jeremy Herrin. The play was revived at the Duke of York's Theatre in the West End in 2008, opening on 1 May.  It made its American premiere in May 2010, at the Manhattan Theatre Club, running through until 27 June.

Plot
Mia is at boarding school and has access to her mother's drugs. She gets into trouble for drugging a fellow student and this causes her father to be brought back to England from Hong Kong.  Henry, her brother, has dropped out of school and has to stay at home and look after his alcoholic mother.  Martha, their fading glamorous mother, controls their lives whilst her own sick mind and world crumble around her.

Original West End production
When That Face premiered on the West End, the cast was as follows: Lindsay Duncan, Hannah Murray, Matt Smith, Catherine Steadman and Julian Wadham. Prior to the West End transfer, Felicity Jones played the Hannah Murray role.

2010 New York production
The Manhattan Theatre Club mounted the play on its Stage I in May 2010, with Cristin Milioti and Christopher Abbott portraying the siblings, and Laila Robins as the mother.

Landor Theatre
That Face received its first London revival at The Landor Theatre from 12 November to 1 December 2013, starring Caroline Wildi as Martha, Rory Fleck-Byrne as Henry, Stephanie Hyam as Mia and Georgina Leonidas as Izzy.

Critical reaction
That Face was received positively by critics, who particularly praised the new writer and the performances from the actors. Charles Spencer of The Daily Telegraph said it was "a blazing, no-holds barred production… Fresh, passionate and blackly comic – exhilarating... Lindsay Duncan’s superb performance...Matt Smith is outstanding.". The Daily Express mentioned that "Polly Stenham is a modern successor to Tennessee Williams or Edward Albee... Intensely moving, skillfully crafted piece." The Daily Express, The Evening Standard, The Guardian, The Times, Time Out, Metro, Radio 4 and The Sunday Times also reviewed it very positively. In late 2009, the play was named at no. 9 in The Times Top Twenty Plays of the Decade. It also received three Olivier Award nominations (one in 2008, before the transfer, then nods for Best New Play and Best Actress in a Play in 2009).

References
Footnotes

Sources
Benedict, David (25 April 2007). "That Face". Variety. Retrieved on 19 April 2008.
Wolf, Matt (9 May 2007). "In London, Two Small Shows Attract Full Houses". International Herald Tribune. Retrieved on 19 April 2008.

English plays
2008 plays
West End plays